The Papal Chase is a 2004 Canadian micro-budget feature-length guerrilla-style mockumentary directed by Kenny Hotz of Kenny vs. Spenny fame, and written by Hotz and Paul Johnson.  The film features cameo appearances by Mick Jagger, Keith Richards, and Ron Wood, as well as footage of Toronto mayoral candidate Kevin Clarke. It is also the only comedy feature that has an appearance by Pope John Paul II. Among its awards, the film won the Phillip Borsos Award for Best Canadian Feature Film at the 2004 Whistler Film Festival, and won 'Best Documentary' at the 2005 Canadian Filmmakers' Festival.

Plot 
When Pope John Paul II is visiting Canada in 2002, Kenny Hotz's friend Paul bets him $1000 that Kenny (who is Jewish) can't meet him.  Over the course of six days, Kenny wears various disguises and makes multiple efforts to meet the pope in order to win the bet. Kenny's attempts include becoming a "Pope-arazzi", fighting his way through millions of pilgrims and onlookers, thousands of cops, security guards, Vatican Special Forces, and precision snipers.  Along the way, Kenny crosses paths with various members of The Rolling Stones.

Cast
 Kenny Hotz as himself
 Sebastian Cluer as himself
 Pope John Paul II as himself
 Mick Jagger as himself (Cameo)
 Keith Richards as himself (Cameo)
 Ronnie Wood as himself (Cameo)

Release
The film debuted on December 2, 2004, at the Whistler Film Festival and had its US premiere at the Brooklyn International Film Festival in June 2005.

Recognition

Reception

Awards and nominations
 2004, won Borsos Competition Award for Best Canadian Feature Film at Whistler Film Festival
 2005, won audience award for 'Best Documentary' at Canadian Filmmakers' Festival
 2005, won audience award for 'Best Film' at Canadian Filmmakers' Festival for Kenny Hotz
 2005, won audience award for 'Best Documentary' at Brooklyn International Film Festival
 2005, won audience award for 'Documentary' at Brooklyn International Film Festival for Kenny Hotz

References

External links 
The Papal Chase on itunes
 Official page of film on producer's website, where the film can be watched
 
 
 The Papal Chase Pilot on Kenny Hotz's Official channel

2004 films
Canadian documentary films
Films about Pope John Paul II
2004 documentary films
English-language Canadian films
2000s English-language films
2000s Canadian films